Devin George Durrant (born October 20, 1960) is an American retired professional basketball player. From 1984 to 1985 he played with the Indiana Pacers and with the Phoenix Suns. He later played in European basketball leagues until 1988. In a Deseret News poll in the year 2000, he was voted one of the top 10 college basketball players in the state of Utah over the previous 100 years.
In 1999, Sports Illustrated listed him as one of the 50 greatest Utah sports figures.

Durrant has also served in various roles in the Church of Jesus Christ of Latter-day Saints (LDS Church), including president of the Texas Dallas Mission and as a counselor in the church's Sunday School general presidency.

Early life and college

Born in Brigham City, Utah, Durrant was named a McDonald's All-American in 1978 during his senior year of high school. He was captain of the Provo High School team that won a state basketball championship.

Durrant attended Brigham Young University (BYU) where he played basketball and started every game of his collegiate basketball career.  He helped the Cougars to three NCAA postseason berths, three WAC championships, and an overall record of 79–38.  During his senior year, Durrant averaged 27.9 points per game, good for third in the nation.  For his efforts, he was named second-team All-American by the AP, NABC, and USBWA. He graduated from BYU in 1984.

Professional career
In 1984, Durrant was named District 7 Player of the Year and a consensus All-American.  That same year he was selected as a GTE/CoSida Academic All-American for the second time and awarded an NCAA postgraduate scholarship. Durrant was chosen by the Indiana Pacers as the 25th pick in the NBA Draft. He played a season with the Pacers and part of a second season with the Phoenix Suns.  He also played professionally in Spain (in the teams Santa Coloma and Guadalajara) and France.

After leaving professional basketball in 1988, Durrant worked as a marketing director with WordPerfect Corporation.  He subsequently owned his own real estate investment firm. In 2009, he earned an MBA from the University of Utah.

In 2016, Durrant was inducted into the Utah Sports Hall of Fame. He remains No. 5 on BYU's career scoring list with 2,285 points.

Church service
Durrant is a member of  the LDS Church and has served in a variety of positions, including bishop, counselor in a stake presidency, high councilor, and stake mission president. As a young man, Durrant served as a full-time missionary in the church's Spain Madrid Mission. From 2011 to 2014, he served as president of the church's Texas Dallas Mission.

At the church's April 2014 General Conference, while still serving as a mission president in Texas, Durrant was accepted by the membership as second counselor to Tad R. Callister in the church's Sunday School General Presidency.  Durrant completed his service in Texas and officially began the Sunday School assignment in July 2014. In May 2015, the LDS Church announced that John S. Tanner, who was serving as the first counselor in the Sunday School General Presidency, had been appointed as the next president of Brigham Young University-Hawaii.  As a result, in June 2015 Durrant was called as first counselor, with Brian K. Ashton succeeding Durrant as second counselor.

Durrant has spoken three times in the church's general conference.  The first was in April 1984, just after completing his playing career at BYU, where he spoke on the topic of missionary work.  He spoke again in the October 2015 General Conference, while serving in the Sunday School General Presidency. In his speech he encouraged listeners to "ponderize" (a portmanteau of "ponder" and "memorize") passages from LDS scripture. The day after his sermon it was discovered that Durrant's son had launched the website ponderize.us selling "ponderize" merchandise. After a backlash on social media the website was taken down and Durrant issued an apology.  He spoke again in April 2018 about teaching families in the homes in a Christ-like manner.

Author
Durrant has written two books.  The first book is titled, Raising an All-American: Helping Your Child Succeed in Athletics and in Life.  The second book title is The Values Delta: A Small and Simple Way to Make a Positive Difference in Your Personal and Professional Life.

Personal life
Durrant's parents are George and Marilyn Durrant. Durrant and his wife, Julie, are the parents of six children.

See also
List of general officers of The Church of Jesus Christ of Latter-day Saints

References

External links 

Devin Durrant at Basketball Reference
BYU Basketball's All-Time Starting Five @ SB Nation
Cougar History – Five @ Bleacher Report
Deseret News: Durrant's induction into the Utah Sports Hall of Fame
Salt Lake Tribune: Durrant's induction into the Utah Sports Hall of Fame

1960 births
Living people
20th-century Mormon missionaries
21st-century Mormon missionaries
All-American college men's basketball players
American expatriate basketball people in France
American leaders of the Church of Jesus Christ of Latter-day Saints
American men's basketball players
American Mormon missionaries in Spain
American Mormon missionaries in the United States
Basketball players from Utah
BYU Cougars men's basketball players
Counselors in the General Presidency of the Sunday School (LDS Church)
Indiana Pacers draft picks
Indiana Pacers players
Latter Day Saints from Utah
McDonald's High School All-Americans
Mission presidents (LDS Church)
Olympique Antibes basketball players
Phoenix Suns players
Small forwards
Sportspeople from Provo, Utah